Corrinne May (born Corrinne Foo May Ying; 19 January 1973) is a Los Angeles-based Singaporean musician, singer, and songwriter.

Life and career
She graduated from the prestigious Berklee College of Music in Boston, and began her career as a singer-songwriter in Los Angeles. Her debut album Fly Away, which included a song with Carole King and Carole Bayer Sager titled "If You Didn't Love Me", was released in 2001.

She married Kavin Hoo in 2003, whom she first met in late 1996. they have one daughter, Claire. To date, she has released five albums, the latest being Crooked Lines in 2012.

In March 2012, May released her album Crooked Lines, whose inspiration was based on May's experience with raising her daughter Claire during her four-year career hiatus. The song from the album, "Beautiful Life", earned an accolade in 2014 for top local English pop song at the 19th Annual Composers and Authors Society of Singapore (Compass) Awards. Another song from the album, "When I Close My Eyes", was inspired by Claire's favorite children's book of the same name. May recorded an acoustic version of "Just What I Was Looking For" on video. Other tracks of the album are "In My Arms", "Lazarus", "24 Hours", "You Believed", "Pinocchio", "Because of Love", "Your Song", "Sight of Love", and "If You Ask".

Corrinne also participated in an album named 'Celebrate Breath', the twentieth in a series of Celebrate albums from Craig 'n Co., produced by Kavin Hoo and Todd Herzog.

Discography

 Fly Away (2001)
 Safe in a Crazy World (2005)
 The Gift (2006)
 Beautiful Seed (2007)
 Crooked Lines (2012)

Awards

References

External links

 
 
 

1973 births
Berklee College of Music alumni
Christian music songwriters
Living people
National University of Singapore alumni
Performers of Christian music
Raffles Junior College alumni
21st-century Singaporean women singers
Singaporean people of Chinese descent
Singaporean Roman Catholics
Raffles Girls' Secondary School alumni